NEMS Enterprises is a metal Latin-American record label led by the Argentinian businessman Marcelo Cabuli founded in 1987 as a CD and vinyl distribution company. In 1995 Nems turned into a label company. The first band they signed was Angra. Nems also organized shows.

Marcelo Cabuli is married to Tarja Turunen.

Artists
The label produced albums by:
Angra
Nepal
The label licensed recordings (to distribute them in South America) by:
Heavens Gate
Saxon
Gamma Ray
Stratovarius
Royal Hunt
King Diamond
Amorphis
Manowar
Helloween
Nightwish
Motörhead (Snake Bite Love album)
Blackmore's Night
Blind Guardian
Tarja Turunen

See also
List of record labels

External links
 NEMS Enterprises

References

Argentine record labels
Heavy metal record labels